The Monastery of San Paio de Antealtares (Galician: Mosteiro de San Paio de Antealtares) is a monastery in Santiago de Compostela, Galicia, Spain. 

It was founded in the 11th century by Alfonso II of Asturias and conceived as a Benedictine monastery originally integrated by twelve monks. It was initially aimed to look after and render worship to the newly discovered tomb of the Apostle James, which brought a pilgrimage status to the city.

Once the Benedictine monks left the monastery in 1499, it was occupied by cloistered nuns and dedicated to Pelagius of Córdoba, a 10th-century Galician child captured, tortured and dismembered by order of the Caliph Abd-ar-Rahman III of al-Andalus after his refusal to renounce of his Christian faith.    

The present-day construction can almost entirely be traced back to the 17th and 18th centuries. 

Monasteries in Galicia (Spain)
Buildings and structures in the Province of A Coruña